Miss Montenegro (Montenegrin: Mis Crne Gore) is a national Beauty pageant in Montenegro.

History

Prior to the birth of Miss Montenegro in late 2006, Ivana Knežević was handpicked to become the first official international representative of Montenegro as an independent state to Miss World 2006, after the union of Serbia and Montenegro came to an end on 3 June 2006. Ivana was a Montenegrin finalist in the last Miss Serbia and Montenegro ever held, won by Serbian Vedrana Grbović in 2006.

President
Vesna de Vinča president of Miss Montenegro is a TV author, journalist, TV director, editor, and screenwriter. Since 1993, she has been the TV programme editor on the documentary programme, RTS, the biggest radio and TV network in Serbia & Montenegro. Her TV programs are broadcast via satellite. She has been running her own TV production company since 2004.

Titleholders
The following is a list of winners. From 2006 to present.

Big Four pageants representatives

Miss Universe Montenegro

Miss Montenegro has started to send a Miss Universe Montenegro to Miss Universe from 2007. On occasion, when the winner does not qualify (due to age) for either contest, a runner-up is sent.

Miss World Montenegro

Miss Montenegro has started to send a Miss World Montenegro to Miss World from 2006. On occasion, when the winner does not qualify (due to age) for either contest, a runner-up is sent. Since Serbia and Montenegro split to two countries, Montenegro has not achievement from debuting in 2006 to present.

See also 
Montenegro at major beauty pageants

References

External links
 Official Miss Montenegro website

Beauty pageants in Montenegro
Montenegrin awards
2006 establishments in Montenegro
Montenegro